NGC 3613 is an elliptical galaxy in the constellation Ursa Major. It was discovered by the astronomer William Herschel on April 8, 1793. NGC 3613 is the center of a cluster of galaxies, and has an estimated globular cluster population of over 2,000.

In 2011, SN 2011eh, a type Ia supernova with a peculiar spectrum, was detected within NGC 3613.

References

External links 
 

Ursa Major (constellation)
3613
Elliptical galaxies
034583